The discography of the Dead Daisies, an Australian-American hard rock band, consists of six studio albums, one live album, one cover album, five extended plays (EPs), 42 singles and 22 music videos. Formed in 2013, the group released their self-titled debut album on Spitfire Records that August, which reached number 42 on the Australian ARIA Albums Chart. This was followed by Revolución in 2015 and Make Some Noise in 2016, the latter of which charted in the top 40 in Austria, Germany, Switzerland, and the UK. The group released their first live album Live & Louder in 2017, which reached the top ten of the UK Rock & Metal Albums Chart.

In 2018, the Dead Daisies released their fourth album Burn It Down, which charted in the US on the Billboard Independent Albums chart at number 19. "Rise Up", the second single from the album, charted at number 35 on the Billboard Active Rock chart. Locked and Loaded: The Covers Album followed in 2019, reaching number 4 on the UK Rock & Metal Albums Chart and number 9 on the UK Independent Albums Chart. 2021 saw the release of Holy Ground, which reached the top ten of the Billboard Independent Albums chart. Singles "Bustle and Flow" and "Holy Ground (Shake the Memory)" both reached the top 20 of the Billboard Mainstream Rock Indicator chart.

Albums

Studio albums

Cover albums

Live albums

Extended plays

Singles

Music videos

References

External links
The Dead Daisies official website

Dead Daisies, the
Dead Daisies, the